State Highway 31 (SH 31) is a State Highway in Kerala, India that starts in Cherkala and ends at the state boundary at Adkasthala near Perla.

The Route Map 
Cherkala (NH17) - Badiadka town - SPP Road joins - Perla town - Adakasthala - State border

See also 
Roads in Kerala
List of State Highways in Kerala

References 

State Highways in Kerala
Roads in Kasaragod district